Gibsonia is an unincorporated community and census-designated place in Richland Township, Allegheny County, in the U.S. state of Pennsylvania, north of the city of Pittsburgh. 

It had a population of 2,785 at the 2020 Census. Its ZIP code is 15044.

Geography
Gibsonia appears on the Valencia U.S. Geological Survey Map. The area is in the Eastern time zone (GMT -5).

Demographics

History
Gibsonia was named in honor of the Gibson family who settled the area; their original house was demolished in December 2019. The early history of Gibsonia is, naturally enough, interwoven with the history of the Gibson family. About the time of the Civil War, Charles Gibson, Jr., built the first steam flour mill west of the Alleghenies on Grubbs Road. His granddaughter, Nancy Gibson James, recalls hearing her uncle tell of the farmers riding to the mill with sacks of grain across the saddles. The Gibson family homestead was built by her grandfather, Charles Gibson, Jr., in 1839. Just below the former site of the home, near the railroad crossing, still remains the foundation of Charles Gibson's general store. This building, destroyed by fire in 1908, besides housing the store was also the first post office in Gibsonia. For about ten years before it burned it was in use as a mission of the Christian & Missionary Alliance Church.

The village was linked to Pittsburgh and Butler by the Pittsburgh and Butler Street Railway in 1907. The line closed in 1931, services being replaced by buses along Route 8.

It is the home of the Western Pennsylvania Model Railroad Museum.

Education

The area around Gibsonia is mainly located in the Pine-Richland School District, as well as the Hampton Township School District, North Allegheny School District, Deer Lakes School District, and a small portion of the Mars Area School District. According to Greatschools.com, Pine-Richland School District ranks 10/10, Hampton Township School District ranks 10/10, Deer Lakes School District ranks 7/10, and Mars Area School District ranks 9/10 based on academic performance on state tests.

The Aquinas Academy of Pittsburgh is located south of Gibsonia in Hampton Township. It is a private school serving pre-K through Grade 12.

Gibsonia is also the site of Chatham University's Eden Hall campus, which is used for various environmental studies, and as a community college for Gibsonia.

Amenities
Gibsonia is home to many offerings for local shoppers. The Richland Mall is located on Route 8. Shops located in this mall are Shop 'n Save, Kohl's, T.J. Maxx, Emiliano's Mexican Restaurant & Bar, and  Command Performance Salon. Route 8 is also home to a Walmart, Econo Lodge, The North Park Club House, All Pet Animal Hospital, Advance Auto Parts, Award & More, Rite Aid, Lin's Garden, Kings Family Restaurants, Giant Eagle, Starbucks,  Adrian's Pizza, Dunham's Sports, various fast food restaurants, and more. Late in the 2000s, a new shopping complex was built along Route 8 in Gibsonia. It is located near the border of Bakerstown next to the Grandview neighborhood of Gibsonia. This shopping mall is home to a Target, Buffalo Wild Wings, Lowe's, Sally's Beauty Supply, Applebee's, Starbucks, Pizza Hut, GameStop, and a PNC Bank. The Treesdale neighborhood of Gibsonia is also home to a few local offerings, such as Luca's Bistro, Lamparski Orthodontics, and Salon Vivace.

Notable people
 Erik Buell, founder, Erik Buell Racing; CTO, Buell Motorcycle Company
 David I. Cleland, the "Father of Project Management"
 Jackie Evancho, classical crossover singer, actress, and model
 Stephen Frick, retired NASA astronaut and commander of two space shuttle missions in 2002 and 2008
 Meghan Klingenberg, member of United States Women's National Soccer Team 
 Louis J. Reizenstein, philanthropist, international importer of glass and china ware
 Florence S. Reizenstein, civil rights activist

 Fran Rogel, Penn State and Pittsburgh Steeler All-Pro running back
 Brandon Saad, National Hockey League player and two-time Stanley Cup winner with the Chicago Blackhawks
 Jonas Salk, resident when he developed the vaccine for polio
 Joe Trees, industrialist and noted philanthropist; his  estate in Gibsonia was devoted to a large extent to fruit trees
 Neil Walker, former Pittsburgh Pirates second baseman

References

Census-designated places in Allegheny County, Pennsylvania
Census-designated places in Pennsylvania
Unincorporated communities in Allegheny County, Pennsylvania
Unincorporated communities in Pennsylvania